Varín is a village and municipality in Žilina District in the Žilina Region of northern Slovakia. It is located at the Malá Fatra National Park and also serves as a tourist resort.

Etymology
The name is derived from Proto-Slavic varъ ("boiling"). The original name was a hydronym referring to foamed water.

History
In historical records the village was first mentioned in 1235. In the middle of the 13th century as terra Warna it was property of the Cseszneky de Milvány family.
In 1993, the local government named one of the streets after Jozef Tiso, a president of the First Slovak Republic, the client state of Nazi Germany. This action sparkled controversy amongst some people and in 2021 a law enforcement authority launched a criminal investigation.

Geography
The municipality lies at an altitude of 362 metres and covers an area of 19.092 km². It has a population of about 3,674 people.

Notable natives and residents
Pavol Gábor, opera singer
 Ladislav Pfliegel, Hero of the Slovak National Uprising

References

External links
www.varin.sk

Villages and municipalities in Žilina District